Osterburg is a town in the district of Stendal, in Saxony-Anhalt, Germany, situated approximately  northwest of Stendal.

Geography 
The town Osterburg consists of the following 11 Ortschaften or municipal divisions:

Ballerstedt
Düsedau
Erxleben
Flessau
Gladigau
Königsmark
Krevese
Meseberg
Osterburg
Rossau
Walsleben

Ballerstedt, Düsedau, Erxleben, Flessau, Gladigau, Königsmark, Krevese, Meseberg, Rossau and Walsleben are former municipalities that were absorbed into Osterburg in July 2009.

History
In the 1990s scanty wooden relics of a castle and ceramics were unearthed behind the municipal library in the Market Place (Großer Markt). The castle was built in the second half of the 10th century and inhabited until 1100 approximately. The town's name (burg meaning "castle") could refer to this castle.

The oldest document in which Osterburg was mentioned was written in 1208, and it was described as "oppidum et castrum", i.e. a town with a castle. Osterburg became a member of the Hanseatic League in 1359, and had about 1,500 inhabitants at the end of the Middle Ages. Two thirds of the town burnt down in 1761.

Sights
After the town hall dating from 1668 had burnt down in 1761 the present town hall was built in 1771. It was renovated and enlarged in 1879 and 1905.

Saint Nikolai Church was built in a romanic style with three naves in 1188. In the 15th century it was transformed into a gothic hall church which was renovated in 1890. Its pulpit dates from 1598. The baptismal font was made of bronze in 1442 and the organ dates from 1824.

The Neptune Fountain in front of the church was made in Italy at the beginning of the 20th century. Originally it belonged to the castle of Rönnebeck, a village about 8 km from Osterburg. The castle was demolished in 1947 and the statue was placed in the Market Place of Osterburg in 1950.

The museum Osterburger Kreisheimatmuseum which was founded in 1936 is in a half-timbered house dating from 1762.
The municipal library is in Kreyenbergsches Haus, a half-timbered house dating from 1770 at the Market Place (Großer Markt).

St. Martin's Chapel in the eastern part of Osterburg outside the historical centre was founded in the 12th century and transformed into a small neogothic church in 1868. The oldest part of the building consisting of rubble and small glacial erratics  is clearly recognizable.

Krumke, a village about 3 km from Osterburg which was incorporated into the town, is known for its castle and its park.

International relations

Osterburg is twinned with:
 Wieluń, Poland

People from Osterburg 
 Friedrich Wilhelm Weidemann (1668–1750), court painter for Frederick I of Prussia
 Franz Ludwig Güssefeld (1744–1807), cartographer
 Richard Armstedt (1851-1931), historian
 Georg Lindemann (1884–1963), cavalry officer and field commander
 Rudolf Bamler (1896–1972), Wehrmacht general and later Stasi officer
 Wolfgang Abraham (1942–2013), soccer player

References

External links

 

 
Towns in Saxony-Anhalt
Stendal (district)
Members of the Hanseatic League